TPS Pakistan is a  Pakistani technology company established in 1996 by two entrepreneurs Mohammed Sohail and Mubashir Rahim.

Company background
TPS Pakistan's two founders, Mohammad Sohail and Mubashir Rahim completed their higher education in the US in engineering and returned to Pakistan in the early 1990s. Before returning, they worked for a short period at NCR Corporation, a software and electronics company which is primarily involved in selling computer servers and ATMs. They returned to Pakistan and decided to form their own software company in Karachi. They both worked very hard and mainly looked for opportunities in networking connectivity especially in the banking and financial sectors. In 2015, CEO of TPS Pakistan, Shahzad Shahid compared Pakistan with the neighboring countries like Sri Lanka, India and Bangladesh where more people had bank accounts and emphasized the need for Pakistan to catch up with them.

Accomplishments

Business agreements with other companies
 In 2017, National Bank of Pakistan launched 'Pre-paid' cards with the cooperation of TPS Pakistan company.
 As of 2015, TPS Pakistan reportedly claims that around 40 microfinance banks were part of their inter-bank-shared-switch-1LINK, an interbank network in Pakistan. Before adopting their software, individual banks in Pakistan were using a software application that allowed them to have links with only their own ATMs during regular banking hours only. Most banks in Pakistan needed to have online network connectivity for their ATMs especially after banking hours. Simply put, Pakistani banks needed to have connectivity all the time and at all hours of the day with not only their own ATMs but also those of other banks to make it convenient for bank customers to be able to use all ATMs regardless of where they had their individual bank accounts.
 TPS Pakistan reportedly claims that they developed the badly needed Inter-Bank Fund Transfer (IBFT) technology in Pakistan which then allowed electronic fund transfers from bank to bank in real time.
 As this technology already existed in many countries, TPS Pakistan reportedly wanted to introduce it in Pakistan with their developed software to allow people to do their basic banking transactions through the internet and mobile phones.
Headquarters
TPS Pakistan's headquarters are located at TPS Tower in Karachi, Pakistan

TPS Pakistan's headquarters were located in Business Avenue Karachi, Pakistan. In 2008 TPS Pakistan announced that it was moving its headquarters from Business Avenue to a bigger and spacious building named as TPS Tower in Karachi, Pakistan.

History
TPS Pakistan started off as a two-man operation in 1996 by the name of Transaction Processing Systems, it gradually grew and eventually was incorporated with the Securities and Exchange Commission of Pakistan as TPS Pakistan (Private) Limited company'' in 2003.

See also

 List of companies involved with ATMs

References

Companies established in 1996
Software companies of Pakistan
Payment systems
Private equity portfolio companies